The Convention Between the United States and Great Britain (1930) was an agreement between the governments the United Kingdom and the United States to definitely delimit the boundary between North Borneo (then a British protectorate) and the Philippine archipelago (then a U.S. Territory).

The convention was signed in Washington, D.C., on January 2, 1930, by U.S. Secretary of State Henry L. Stimson and British Ambassador to the United States Esme Howard. It was ratified by the U.S. in February 1930 and, after clarification by exchanges of notes between the two governments in 1930 and 1932, by the United Kingdom in November 1932. It entered into force after an exchange of ratifications on December 13, 1932.

References

Treaties concluded in 1930
Treaties entered into force in 1932
United Kingdom–United States treaties
Boundary treaties
Malaysia–Philippines border
Borders of Malaysia
Borders of the Philippines
History of the Philippines (1898–1946)
Interwar-period treaties